The Káposztás utcai Stadion is a multi-use stadium in Sopron, Hungary.  It is currently used mostly for football matches and is the home stadium of MFC Sopron.  The stadium is able to hold 5,300 people and was reconstructed in 2003.

History
On 30 September 2015, it was announced that Szombathelyi Haladás would play 6 home matches at the stadium in spring in 2016. Szombathelyi Haladás would host Diósgyőr, Újpest, Békéscsaba, Vasas, Debrecen, and Ferencváros at Káposztás utca during the demolition of Rohonci úti Stadion.

In the 2016–17 Nemzeti Bajnokság I season Szombathelyi Haladás played their home matches in the stadium due to the construction of their new stadium, Haladás Sportkomplexum in Szombathely.

References

External links
Káposztás utcai Stadion at magyarfutball.hu
Stadium pictures at StadiumDB

Football venues in Hungary